Sphere Music is the debut album by pianist Uri Caine featuring two compositions by Thelonious Monk which was first released on the JMT label in 1993.

Reception

In her review for Allmusic, Heather Phares said "An eclectic tour through different musical moods and styles, Sphere Music is an engaging, promising first work".

Track listing
All compositions by Uri Caine except as indicated
 "Mr. B.C." - 8:55   
 "This Is a Thing Called Love" - 7:12   
 "When the Word Is Given" - 5:20   
 "'Round Midnight" (Thelonious Monk) - 4:17   
 "Let Me Count the Ways" - 6:34   
 "Jelly" - 7:18   
 "Just in Time" (Adolph Green, Betty Comden, Jule Styne) - 7:50   
 "We See" (Monk) - 8:02   
 "Jan Fan" - 10:08

Personnel
Uri Caine - piano
Graham Haynes - cornet (tracks 3 & 9)
Don Byron - clarinet (tracks 1, 4 & 6) 
Gary Thomas - tenor saxophone (tracks 3, 7 & 9)
Anthony Cox (tracks 3, 5 & 7-9), Kenny Davis (tracks 1, 2 & 6) - bass
Ralph Peterson, Jr., - drums

References

JMT Records albums
Winter & Winter Records albums
Uri Caine albums
1993 debut albums